The 2012–13 Rayo Vallecano season was the 79th season in club history.

Review and events

Competitions

Legend

La Liga

League table

Matches

Copa del Rey

Squad

Squad, matches played and goals scored

Minutes played
2

Starting 11
No.		Position	Player
2	Spain	DF	Tito
5	Spain	DF	Álex Gálvez
6	Spain	DF	Rodri
8	Spain	MF	Adrián
9	Spain	MF	José Carlos
14	Spain	DF	Anaitz Arbilla
No.		Position	Player
17	Spain	MF	Roberto Trashorras
19	Guinea	FW	Lass
25	Spain	GK	David Cobeño
Colombia	DF	Johan Mojica (on loan from Colombia Llaneros F.C.)
Spain	MF	Raúl Baena
Mexico	FW	Nery Castillo

Bookings

Sources

Rayo Vallecano
Rayo Vallecano seasons